The 2016 Asian Tour was the 22nd season of the modern Asian Tour, the main men's professional golf tour in Asia excluding Japan, since it was established in 1995.

European Tour strategic alliance
In July, it was announced that the European Tour had entered into a strategic alliance with the Asian Tour.

Schedule
The following table lists official events during the 2016 season.

Order of Merit
The Order of Merit was based on prize money won during the season, calculated in U.S. dollars.

Awards

Notes

References

External links
The Asian Tour's official site

Asian Tour
Asian Tour
Asian Tour